Conophytum ficiforme is a small South African species of succulent plant of the genus Conophytum.

Description

The name "ficiforme" is Latin for "fig-shaped", and refers to the shape of their bodies, which is raised, globose and keeled.
In addition, they can be distinguished from most other Conophytums by the distinctive dots, which clearly form angular, (horseshoe-shaped) lines over their heads.

They have pale pink flowers.

Distribution
It is indigenous to the Robertson Karoo vegetation of the Breede River Valley, Western Cape, South Africa. It is especially common in the mountains north of Worcester as well as in McGregor, south of Robertson and in Bonnievale.

Their habitat is rocky crevices and outcrops, where they form clumps in sheltered or partially shaded positions. They receive rainfall primarily in the winter. In the summer they go into dormancy in dry leaf sheathes.

Relatives and distinguishing features
C.ficiforme is closely related to several smaller species which occur to the east of its distribution.

Conophytum piluliforme occurs in the Little Karoo to the east, but has smaller (less than 5 mm x 5 mm), obconical, flattened, "pill-shaped" ("piluliforme") heads, with few or  no spots.

The widespread Conophytum truncatum grows throughout the Little Karoo, but has strongly flattened, truncated bodies, and spots that are scattered randomly (not in lines).

The rarer species Conophytum joubertii also has smaller (less than 5 mm x 5 mm), more convex or cylindrical shaped heads, but has cream or white flowers.

References

Further reading
Hammer,S.(2002) Dumpling and his wife: New views of the genus Conophytum EAE Creative Colour Ltd. .
Hammer,S.(1993) The genus Conophytum : A Conograph Succulent Plant Publications, Pretoria. .
National Botanical Institute of South Africa.(1993) List of Southern African Succulent Plants Umdaus Press.

External links

ficiforme
Endemic flora of South Africa
Flora of the Cape Provinces